Dmitry Nikolayevich Chernyshenko (born 20 September 1968) is a Russian businessman and politician serving as Deputy Prime Minister of Russia for Tourism, Sport, Culture and Communications since 2020. Previously, he was the President of the Sochi 2014 Olympic Organizing Committee for the 2014 Winter Olympics which were held in Sochi, Russia.

Sporting activities
Since 27 November 2014, Chernyshenko has been the President of the Kontinental Hockey League, replacing Alexander Medvedev. In addition, he was appointed as Board Chairman of Gazprom-Media in December 2014. Chernyshenko is also member of the Supervisory Board of Sberbank of Russia (2020–21).

He was removed from the IOC Coordination Commission Beijing 2022 by the International Olympic Committee, due to his involvement in the Russian doping scandal.

Awards and honours
In 2014, Chernyshenko was awarded the Olympic Order and the Paralympic Order. He was stripped of the orders, however, on 28 February and 2 March 2022 respectively due to Russia's invasion of Ukraine. Chernyshenko responded by saying: "Our country has always adhered to the principle that sport is beyond politics, but we are constantly drawn into the politics, because they understand the importance of sport in the lives of our Russian people." In 2023, he further lashed out at the West at the Russian sports forum:

In 2019, Chernyshenko entered the list of the 500 most influential business leaders in media industry for a second year in a row – Variety500 (it is compiled annually by the American magazine Variety).

Sanctions
In February 2022, Dmitry Chernyshenko was sanctioned by the European Union.

In December 2022, the United States sanctioned Dmitry Chernyshenko.

In January 2023, Dmitry Chernyshenko was sanctioned by Japan.

External links
Mini Bio on Sochi 2014 Official Site 
English Twitter account
Russian Twitter account

References

Presidents of the Organising Committees for the Olympic Games
1968 births
Living people
Kontinental Hockey League
Recipients of the Order "For Merit to the Fatherland", 2nd class
Recipients of the Paralympic Order
21st-century Russian politicians
Deputy heads of government of the Russian Federation
Russian individuals subject to European Union sanctions